Fencing events were contested at the 1965 Summer Universiade in Budapest, Hungary.

Medal overview

Men's events

Women's events

Medal table

References
 Universiade fencing medalists on HickokSports

1965 Summer Universiade
Universiade
Fencing at the Summer Universiade
International fencing competitions hosted by Hungary